GreenLight Laser Therapy uses a laser beam to remove prostate tissue. The laser treatment is delivered through a thin, flexible fiber, which is inserted into the urethra through an instrument called a cystoscope.

GreenLight Laser Therapy has been increasingly performed as an alternative to transurethral resection of the prostate (TURP) in order to treat benign prostatic hyperplasia with several studies demonstrating comparable results with fewer side effects and complications. Typically, it is an outpatient procedure which provides immediate relief of lower urinary tract symptoms (LUTS).  It is a virtually bloodless procedure and may be suitable for patients who cannot undergo traditional surgery. GreenLight has well-documented safety and success data since 1997 and has treated more than 500,000 patients worldwide. Cost analyses have shown GreenLight to be less costly than traditional surgery.

References

Further reading
 

Male genital surgery